The Chilean Counter-Terrorism Unit (Spanish: Unidad Anti-Terrorista) or UAT is a tactical unit of the Chilean Air Force designated to handle terrorist threats.

The team is composed of Air Force officers experienced in close combat and terrorist situations (i.e.: hostage situations, bomb situations) and specially airplane kidnapping.

Chilean Air Force